Pseudagrion guichardi is a species of damselfly in the family Coenagrionidae. It is endemic to Ethiopia.  Its natural habitats are subtropical or tropical moist montane forests and rivers. It is threatened by habitat loss.

References

Endemic fauna of Ethiopia
Coenagrionidae
Insects of Ethiopia
Insects described in 1958
Taxonomy articles created by Polbot